The Field Elm cultivar Ulmus minor 'Holmstruph' was selected from seedlings of 'Hoersholmiensis' at Asger M. Jensen's nursery, Holmstrup, Denmark, and featured in the Plant Buyer's Guide ed. 6. 286 1958.

Description
The tree was chosen on account of its strong, quick-growing upright stem and branches bearing small leaves, making it suitable for street planting.

Cultivation
No specimens are known to survive.

Synonymy
Ulmus campestris Holmstrupii

References

Field elm cultivar
Ulmus articles missing images
Ulmus
Missing elm cultivars